Penani Manumalealii (born 14 June 1992) is a Samoan professional rugby league footballer who plays as a  and  for the Newtown Jets in the Intrust Super Premiership NSW, having previously played for the Cronulla-Sutherland Sharks and the Wests Tigers in the NRL.

Early years
Born in Apia, Samoa, Manumalealii was raised in New Zealand and attended Hornby high school while playing his junior football for the Hornby Panthers.

Playing career
As a 16-year-old, Manumalealii moved to Sydney, Australia to play for the Cronulla-Sutherland Sharks. He played for the Sharks' NYC team from 2010 to 2012 before moving on to the Sharks' New South Wales Cup team in 2013.

In Round 2 of the 2014 NRL season, Manumalealii made his NRL debut for the Sharks against the Canterbury-Bankstown Bulldogs.

On 20 March 2014, Manumalealii signed a contract with the Wests Tigers effective immediately for the rest of the season.

At the end of the 2016 season, Manumalealii was not re-signed by the Wests Tigers, instead signing with the Newtown Jets.

Representative career
In 2012, Manumalealii played for the Junior Kiwis.

In 2013, Manumalealii was named in the Samoa squad for the World Cup. He scored a try in their opening match against New Zealand.

In May 2014, Penani played for Samoa in the 2014 Pacific Rugby League International. He scored three tries in Samoa's 32-16 victory. He dedicated those tries to his mother who had died months earlier.

On 8 September 2014, Manumalealii was selected for the Samoa Four Nations train-on squad. On 7 October 2014, Manumalealii was selected in the Samoa national rugby league team final 24 man squad for the 2014 Four Nations series.

References

External links

2014 Cronulla-Sutherland Sharks profile

1992 births
Living people
Cronulla-Sutherland Sharks players
Junior Kiwis players
Newtown Jets NSW Cup players
Rugby league five-eighths
Rugby league halfbacks
Samoa national rugby league team players
Samoan emigrants to New Zealand
Samoan rugby league players